Lines is the fifth studio album by the American pop group The Walker Brothers. The album was released in 1976 and was the second since reforming in 1975. The album failed to chart and includes the singles "Lines" and "We're All Alone", neither of which met with much success.

The album was stylistically similar to their 1975 comeback No Regrets, matching the general musical styles of Country and Pop music and marrying them to romantic orchestral arrangements. Aside from "First Day" which is actually the work of John Maus, writing under the pseudonym A. Dayam, the album is compiled of non-original compositions. Scott Walker would not contribute new songs to the group until the following album Nite Flights.

Reception

Lines received mixed reviews from the majority of critics.

Track listing

Personnel
 Bones (Brigette du Doit, Janice Slater, Joy Yates, Suzanne Lynch), The Charles Young Choral – backing vocals
 Alan Jones – electric bass
 Steve Gray – string arrangements, conductor
 Barry Morgan, Brian Bennett, Simon Phillips – drums
 Alan Parker – acoustic and electric guitar, mandolin, high-strung guitar, slide guitar 
 Paul Keogh – acoustic guitar 
 The David Katz Orchestra – orchestra
 Gary Walker, Tristan Fry – percussion
 John Mealing, Steve Gray – acoustic piano
 Dave MacRae – electric piano
 Alan Skidmore, Dave Wilus, Jeff Daly – saxophone
 Roger Churchyard – "blue grass" violin
 John Walker, Scott Walker – acoustic guitar, vocals
 Geoff Crook – cover illustration

Release details

References

1976 albums
The Walker Brothers albums
GTO Records albums